Heamin Choi (born January 11, 1984) is a race car driver. He is the first Korean driver to race in the American Open Wheel Series (Pro Mazda, USF2000), and the first Korean driver to participate in any race held in the United States. He has won the 2005 BAT Championship (Formula Korea), 2006 Korea GT championship (GT1), and 2013 Super Race GT driver's title. He was also the Samsung Everland scholarship driver through year 2003 to 2005. In 2016, Choi participated in IndyLights.

Early career
His racing career started at age 15 with his debut at the 1999 Carman Park Kart Grand Prix.
Also in 1999, he entered the team Redstone under Hong Suk Cho, the team director. He finished 4th at his second race.
In 2000 he finished 2nd in the Japan New Tokyo Circuit Freshman Kart Race Time Trial.
By winning five times in the Korean Kart series, he started gaining attention as a Kart prodigy in the Korean motorsport community. 
Choi gained more experience in riding kart at various track with different conditions such as wet and street track.  However, in early 2001, he was injured on his left rib at the Japanese Kart race which had forced him to temporarily stop kart races with high g-force.

2001–2006

In 2001, Choi joined Hankook Tire’s Ventus Motor Sports team, which run formula cars, touring cars, and off-road rallycross cars. He was trained by Myung Mok Lee, who is known as the champion of the Korea Touring Car Championship. In the team, Choi was given the role to test in Formula 1800.  In 2002, Choi marked his debut for the pro formula race in Korea, finishing 6th in his first race qualification and 6th in championship. 
In 2003, Choi was selected as the Samsung Everland Speedway Scholarship driver for the first time and finished 5th at the BAT Championship (Formula 1800).
In 2004, Choi joined the Hyundai Oilbank racing team finishing as a runner-up in the Formula Korea championship.
In 2005, Choi won the driver's championship title of BAT Championship (Formula Korea). In 2006, he moved to Grand Touring Race after achieving the Formula Korea Championship. Despite the difficulty in adapting to the GT car from Formula car, Choi won the championship for GT1 Class.

2007

After Choi won two championship titles in a row, he turned his attention to international competitions. He participated in IMSA Star Mazda Championship (Pro Mazda Championship) at Laguna Seca Race with JDC Motorsports. Choi finished 19th in the race, passing nine cars during the race.

2009–2011
In 2009, Choi participated in the Korean Stock Car race and finished 4th. In 2010 he joined the Atlas BX racing team as a touring car driver and finished 4th in the 2010 F1 Korean GP support race.

2012

In 2012, Choi participated in Coopertire USF2000 Championship. Choi finished 9th in his second event at St. Petersburg and with his continuous progress, he was ranked 6th in his first qualifying at Lucas Oil raceway oval track.

2013

In 2013, Choi took part in the Formula 3 test with Double R racing in England and in the Super Formula pre-season testing at Fuji Speedway in Japan. However, the sponsor company was in the trouble of operating its race track in Korea which left Choi unable to compete in Super Formula series. Therefore, Choi decided to race in Korean GT championship and achieved Driver's Title.

2014
In 2014, Choi participated in the first Korean Le Mans series and won the race with his Korean stock car.

2015–2016 
In 2015, Choi came back to the US to participate in Indy Lights series. He finished 11th in his debut event at Laguna Seca. In 2016, Choi participated in all oval races of the season in Indy Lights. He finished in the top 10 at Iowa speedway and 12th at Laguna Seca.

Racing record

American open-wheel racing results

U.S. F2000 National Championship

Indy Lights

References

External links
Official website

1984 births
Living people
South Korean racing drivers
Indy Lights drivers
U.S. F2000 National Championship drivers
Sportspeople from Busan
Juncos Hollinger Racing drivers
Arrow McLaren SP drivers